True Grit is a 1969 American Western film directed by Henry Hathaway, starring John Wayne as U.S. Marshal Rooster Cogburn, Glen Campbell as La Boeuf and Kim Darby as Mattie Ross. It is the first film adaptation of Charles Portis' 1968 novel of the same name. The screenplay was written by Marguerite Roberts. Wayne won his only Oscar for his performance in the film and reprised his role for the 1975 sequel Rooster Cogburn.

Historians believe Cogburn was based on Deputy U.S. Marshal Heck Thomas, who brought in some of the toughest outlaws. The cast also features Robert Duvall, Dennis Hopper, Jeff Corey and Strother Martin. The title song, sung by Campbell, was also Oscar-nominated.

A remake of True Grit was released in 2010, starring Jeff Bridges, Matt Damon, Hailee Steinfeld, and Josh Brolin.

Plot
In 1880, Frank Ross, of Yell County, Arkansas, is murdered and robbed by his hired hand, Tom Chaney. Ross's young daughter, Mattie, travels to Fort Smith, where she hires aging U.S. Marshal Reuben "Rooster" J. Cogburn to apprehend Chaney. Mattie has heard that Cogburn has "true grit". Mattie earns the money to pay his fee by shrewdly horse trading. She gives Cogburn a payment to track and capture Chaney, who has taken up with outlaw "Lucky" Ned Pepper in Indian Territory (modern-day Oklahoma).

A young Texas Ranger, La Boeuf, is also pursuing Chaney and joins forces with Cogburn, despite Mattie's protest. The two try, unsuccessfully, to ditch Mattie.

After several days, the three discover horse thieves Emmett Quincy and Moon, who are waiting for Pepper at a remote dugout cabin. Cogburn captures and interrogates the two men. Moon is shot in the leg during the capture, and Cogburn uses the injury as leverage for information about Pepper. Quincy slams a Bowie knife down on Moon's hand to shut him up, severing four of his fingers, then stabs Moon in the chest. Cogburn shoots and kills Quincy. Before he dies, Moon reveals Pepper and his gang are due at the cabin that night for fresh mounts.

Rooster and La Boeuf lay a trap. Upon arriving, Pepper is suspicious and draws La Boeuf's fire, who ruins their planned ambush by shooting and killing Pepper's horse. A firefight ensues, during which Cogburn and La Boeuf kill two of the gang, but Pepper and the rest of his men escape unharmed. Cogburn, La Boeuf, and Mattie make their way to McAlester's store with the dead bodies. Cogburn tries, unsuccessfully, to persuade Mattie to stay at McAlester's.

The two lawmen and Mattie resume their pursuit. Fetching water one morning, Mattie finds herself face-to-face with Chaney. She shoots Chaney with her father's gun, injuring him, and then calling out to her partners. Chaney lunges at Mattie who attempts to fire again, but her gun misfires and she is taken hostage by Chaney. Pepper and his gang arrive, Pepper takes charge of Mattie and threatens to kill her if Cogburn and La Boeuf don't ride away. Pepper leaves Mattie with Chaney, instructing him not to harm her. Mattie is convinced Rooster has abandoned her.

Cogburn and La Boeuf double back. La Boeuf finds and takes charge of Mattie, and they watch from a high bluff as Cogburn confronts Pepper and his gang of three. Cogburn gives Pepper a choice between being killed now, or surrendering and being hanged in Fort Smith. Calling this "bold talk for a one-eyed fat man" (Cogburn wears an eye patch), Pepper enrages Cogburn, who delivers one of cinema's classic lines: "Fill your hand, you son-of-a-bitch!"

Cogburn charges the four outlaws, guns blazing. In the initial head-on charge, Cogburn hits Ned in the chest above the heart. Cogburn eventually kills the Parmalee brothers, with "Dirty Bob" fleeing. The severely wounded Ned has enough strength to shoot Rooster's horse, trapping Rooster's leg under him as Bo goes down. As a last act, the mortally wounded Pepper prepares to kill Rooster, but La Boeuf makes a long shot with his Sharps rifle, killing Ned.

As La Boeuf and Mattie return to Pepper's camp, Chaney comes out from behind a tree and strikes La Boeuf in the head with a rock, knocking him unconscious. Mattie shoots Chaney again, but the gun's recoil knocks her back into a snake pit. Her arm is broken in the fall and she is caught in a hole, drawing the attention of a rattlesnake. Cogburn appears and shoots Chaney, who falls backwards into the pit, dead. Cogburn lowers himself down into the pit on a rope to retrieve Mattie, who is bitten by the snake before Cogburn shoots and kills it. La Boeuf helps them out of the pit before dying.

Cogburn is forced to leave La Boeuf's body behind as he and Mattie race to get help on Mattie's pony, which drops from exhaustion, forcing Cogburn to commandeer a wagon to get Mattie to a doctor he knows in the territory. Sometime later, Mattie's attorney, J. Noble Daggett, (John Fiedler) meets Cogburn in Fort Smith. On Mattie's behalf, Daggett pays Cogburn the remainder of his fee in Chaney's capture, plus a $200 bonus for saving her life. Cogburn offers to wager the money on a bet that Mattie will recover just fine, a bet Daggett declines.

In the epilogue, Mattie, her arm in a sling, is back at home recovering from her injuries. She promises Cogburn he will be buried next to her in the Ross family plot after his death. Cogburn accepts her offer and leaves, jumping over a fence on his new horse to disprove her good-natured jab that he was too old and fat to clear a four-rail fence.

Cast

 John Wayne as Reuben J. "Rooster" Cogburn
 Glen Campbell as La Boeuf
 Kim Darby as Mattie Ross
 Jeremy Slate as Emmett Quincy
 Robert Duvall as Lucky Ned Pepper
 Dennis Hopper as Moon
 Alfred Ryder as Goudy
 Strother Martin as Col. G. Stonehill
 Jeff Corey as Tom Chaney
 Ron Soble as Captain Boots Finch
 John Fiedler as Lawyer Daggett 
 James Westerfield as Judge Parker
 John Doucette as Sheriff
 Donald Woods as Barlow
 Edith Atwater as Mrs. Floyd
 Carlos Rivas as Mexican Bob
 Isabel Boniface as Mrs. Bagby
 H.W. Gim as Chen Lee
 Ginger Cat as General Sterling Price (uncredited)
 John Pickard as Frank Ross
 Elizabeth Harrower as Mrs. Ross
 Ken Renard as Yarnell
 Hank Worden as R. Ryan, the undertaker at Fort Smith
 Jay Ripley as Harold Parmalee
 Kenneth Becker as Farrell Parmalee
 Wilford Brimley as Minor Role (uncredited)
 Leo Alton as Boarding House Guest (uncredited)  
 Forrest Burns as Courtroom Spectator (uncredited)
 Gene Coogan as Boarding House Guest (uncredited) 
 Myron Healey as Deputy at Prisoner Unloading (uncredited)
 Boyd "Red" Morgan as Red (Ferryman) (uncredited)
 James McEachin as Judge Parker's Bailiff (uncredited) 
 Dennis McMullen as Bailiff (uncredited)
 Robin Morse as Bit Part (uncredited)  
 Stuart Randall as McAlester (uncredited) 
 Connie Sawyer as Talkative Woman at Hanging (uncredited)
 Jeffrey Sayre as Courtroom Spectator (uncredited)  
 Jay Silverheels as Condemned Man at Hanging (uncredited) 
 Dean Smith as Minor Role (uncredited)
 Vince St. Cyr as Gaspargoo (uncredited)  
 Max Wagner as Courtroom Spectator (uncredited) 
 Guy Wilkerson as the Hangman (uncredited)
 Chalky Williams as Courtroom Spectator (uncredited) 
 Tom Gosnell as John Wayne stunt double (uncredited)

Production
Filming took place mainly in Ouray County, Colorado, in the vicinity of Ridgway (now the home of the True Grit Cafe), around the town of Montrose (in Montrose County), and the town of Ouray. (The script maintains the novel's references to place names in Arkansas and Oklahoma, in dramatic contrast to the Colorado topography.) The courtroom scenes were filmed at Ouray County Courthouse in Ouray.

The scenes that take place at the "dugout" and along the creek where Quincy and Moon are killed, as well as the scene where Rooster carries Mattie on her horse Little Blackie after the snakebite, were filmed at Hot Creek on the east side of the Sierra Nevada near the town of Mammoth Lakes, California. Mount Morrison and Laurel Mountain form the backdrop above the creek. This location was also used in North to Alaska. Filming was done from September to December 1968.

Mia Farrow was originally cast as Mattie and was keen on the role. However, prior to filming, she made a film in England with Robert Mitchum, who advised her not to work with director Henry Hathaway because he was "cantankerous". Farrow asked producer Hal B. Wallis to replace Hathaway with Roman Polanski, who had directed Farrow in Rosemary's Baby, but Wallis refused. Farrow quit the film, which was then offered to Michele Carey,  Sondra Locke and Tuesday Weld, but all three were under contract for another film. John Wayne met Karen Carpenter at a talent show he was hosting and recommended her for the part, though the producers decided against it because she had no acting experience. Wayne had also lobbied for his daughter Aissa to win the part. Olivia Hussey was also offered the role by Wallis, but the offer was rescinded after she said she "couldn't see herself with Wayne" and said that he "can't act." After also considering Sally Field, the role went to Kim Darby.

Elvis Presley was the original choice for LaBoeuf, but the producers turned him down when his agent demanded top billing over both Wayne and Darby. Glen Campbell was then cast instead. In multiple interviews, Campbell claimed that Wayne, along with his daughter, approached him backstage at his show, and asked him if he would like to be in a movie.

Wayne began lobbying for the part of Rooster Cogburn after reading the novel by Charles Portis.

Wayne called Marguerite Roberts' script "the best script he had ever read", and was instrumental in getting her script approved and credited to her name after Roberts had been blacklisted for alleged leftist affiliations years before. This came in spite of Wayne's own conservative ideals. He particularly liked the scene with Darby where Rooster tells Mattie about his life in Illinois (where he has a restaurant, his wife Nola leaves him because of his degenerate friends, and has a clumsy son named Horace), calling it "about the best scene I ever did". Garry Wills notes in his book, John Wayne's America: The Politics of Celebrity, that Wayne's performance as Rooster Cogburn bears close resemblance to the way Wallace Beery portrayed similar characters in the 1930s and 1940s, an inspired if surprising choice on Wayne's part. Wills comments that it is difficult for one actor to imitate another for the entire length of a movie and that the Beery mannerisms temporarily recede during the aforementioned scene in which Cogburn discusses his wife and child.

Veteran John Wayne stunt-double Tom Gosnell does the stunt in the meadow, where "Bo" goes down, on his longtime horse Twinkle Toes. In the last scene, Mattie gives Rooster her father's gun. She comments that he has gotten a tall horse, as she expected he would. He notes that his new horse can jump a four-rail fence. Then she admonishes him, "You're too old and fat to be jumping horses." Rooster responds with a smile, saying, "Well, come see a fat old man sometime," and jumps his new horse over a four-rail fence. Although many of Wayne's stunts over the years were done by Hayward and Chuck Roberson, it is Wayne on Twinkle Toes going over the fence. This stunt had been left to the last shot as Wayne wanted to do it himself and following his lung surgery in 1965, neither Hathaway nor Wayne was sure he could make the jump. Darby's stunts were done by Polly Burson.

The horse shown during the final scene of True Grit (before he jumps the fence on Twinkle Toes) was Dollor, a two-year-old (in 1969) chestnut Quarter Horse gelding. Dollor ('Ol Dollor) was Wayne's favorite horse for 10 years. Wayne fell in love with the horse, which carried him through several more Westerns, including his final movie, The Shootist. Wayne had Dollor written into the script of The Shootist because of his love for the horse; it was a condition for him working on the project. Wayne would not let anyone else ride the horse, the lone exception being Robert Wagner, who rode the horse in a segment of the Hart to Hart television show, after Wayne's death.

After reading True Grit by Charles Portis, John Wayne was enthusiastic about playing the part of Rooster Cogburn, but as production got closer, Wayne got jumpy — he did not have a handle on how to play Rooster Cogburn. He was, of course, nervous because the part was out of his comfort zone and had not been specifically tailored to his screen character by one of his in-house screenwriters. Henry Hathaway, who directed the film, calmed Wayne's doubts, most notably concerning the eye patch which was made of gauze, allowing Wayne to see. John Wayne thought the picture had been edited too tightly by Hathaway. Nevertheless, in May 1969, a few weeks before the picture was released, Wayne wrote to Marguerite Roberts thanking her for her "magnificent" screenplay, especially for the beautiful ending in the cemetery that she had devised in Portis's style. Wayne and Kim Darby worked very well together, but Henry Hathaway disliked her, stating: "My problem with her was simple, she's not particularly attractive, so her book of tricks consisted mostly [of] being a little cute. All through the film, I had to stop her from acting funny, doing bits of business and so forth."

By the time the picture got back to the studio interiors, Kim Darby told Hal Wallis she would never work for Hathaway again. John Wayne was another matter. "He was wonderful to work with, he really was", said Darby. "When you work with someone who's a big star as he is ... there's an unspoken thing that they sort of set the environment for the working conditions on the set and the feeling on the set. And he creates an environment that is very safe to work in. He's very supportive of the people around him and the people he works with, very supportive. He's really a reflection, an honest reflection, of what he really is. I mean that's what you see on the screen. He's simple and direct, and I love that in his work." Surrounded by an angry director, a nervous actress, and the inexperienced Glen Campbell, Wayne took the reins between his teeth the same way Rooster Cogburn does in the climax of the film. "He was there on the set before anyone else and knew every line perfectly", said Kim Darby. Both Wayne and Hathaway had difficulties with Robert Duvall, with the director having constant shouting matches with his supporting actor, and Duvall and Wayne nearly coming to blows.

Reception

Box office
The film premiered in Little Rock, Arkansas on June 12, 1969, and opened at the Chinese theatre in Los Angeles on June 13, 1969 where it grossed $38,000 in its first week.

The film earned an estimated $11.5 million in rentals at the United States and Canada box office during its first year of release.

 John Simon wrote, "Worthy of succinct notice is True Grit''', an amusing, unassuming western, antiheroic with a vengeance."

Awards and nominations
John Wayne won the Academy Award for Best Actor. Upon accepting his Oscar, Wayne said, "Wow! If I'd known that, I'd have put that patch on 35 years earlier."

Sequels and other film versions
A film sequel, Rooster Cogburn, was made in 1975, with Wayne reprising his role and Katharine Hepburn as an elderly spinster, Eula Goodnight, who teams with him. The plot has been described as a rehash of the original True Grit with elements of the Bogart–Hepburn film The African Queen. A further made-for-television sequel titled True Grit: A Further Adventure'' appeared in 1978, starring Warren Oates as Rooster Cogburn and Lisa Pelikan as Mattie Ross.

In 2010, Joel and Ethan Coen directed another adaptation of the novel. Their adaptation focuses more on Mattie's point of view, as in the novel, and is somewhat more faithful to its Oklahoma setting—though it was filmed in New Mexico. Hailee Steinfeld portrays Mattie Ross, Jeff Bridges plays Rooster Cogburn, and the cast includes Matt Damon as La Boeuf and Josh Brolin as Tom Chaney.

See also
 List of American films of 1969
 John Wayne filmography
 True Grit (1969 soundtrack)

References

External links

 
 
 
 
 
 
 
 

1969
1969 films
1969 Western (genre) films
1960s English-language films
American Western (genre) films
American films about revenge
Films about the Texas Ranger Division
Films based on American novels
Films based on Western (genre) novels
Films directed by Henry Hathaway
Films featuring a Best Actor Academy Award-winning performance
Films featuring a Best Drama Actor Golden Globe winning performance
Films produced by Hal B. Wallis
Films scored by Elmer Bernstein
Films set in Arkansas
Films set in Oklahoma
Films set in the 1880s
Films shot in Colorado
Paramount Pictures films
United States Marshals Service in fiction
1960s American films
Films about capital punishment